Hava, Maryam, Ayesha is a 2019 Afghan drama film directed by Sahraa Karimi. It was selected as the Afghan entry for Best International Feature Film at the 92nd Academy Awards. However, it was not on the Academy's final list of films for consideration because questions were raised over the legitimacy of the Afghan committee that submitted the film.

Plot
Three women in Kabul face challenging moments in their lives during pregnancy.

Cast
 Arezoo Ariapoor as Hava
 Fereshta Afshar as Maryam
 Hasiba Ebrahimi as Ayesha

See also
 List of submissions to the 92nd Academy Awards for Best International Feature Film
 List of Afghan submissions for the Academy Award for Best International Feature Film

References

External links
 

2019 films
2019 drama films
Afghan drama films
Persian-language films
Dari-language films